Oreophryne idenburgensis is a species of frog in the family Microhylidae.
It is endemic to West Papua, Indonesia.
Its natural habitat is subtropical or tropical moist montane forests.

References

idenburgensis
Amphibians of Western New Guinea
Taxonomy articles created by Polbot
Amphibians described in 1956